A voter identification law is a law that requires a person to show some form of identification in order to vote. In some jurisdictions requiring photo IDs, voters who do not have photo ID often must have their identity verified by someone else (such as in Sweden) or sign a Challenged Voter Affidavit (such as in New Hampshire) in order to receive a ballot to vote.

Examples

Argentina 

In Argentina voting is compulsory for all citizens between 18 and 70 years old, non-compulsory for those older than 70 and between 16 and 18, and citizens with domiciles in foreign countries. To vote they must present a valid Documento Nacional de Identidad at the corresponding voting center.

Most countries in Latin America have similar policies.

Australia
In Australia voting is compulsory for all adult citizens. Failure to cast a ballot may result in a small fine, currently AU$20.

No form of ID is required to cast a ballot in person at a polling location; instead, voters are asked three questions before being issued a ballot, so that they can be checked off the electoral roll: name, residence address, and have you voted before in this election? On election day, voters can vote at any polling place in their state of residence, and at selected polling places in other states.

If a person is voting by mail they are required to include their Australian driver's licence, or Australian passport number and the address they are currently enrolled under.

To register to vote, Australians must fill out a form, provide identification, and send it in the mail. After submission, the form’s contents, in particular the registered voter’s identity in most states, are not double checked by the government.

In October 2021, The Liberal Morrison government had plans for a Voter ID Law, where under the proposed voter integrity bill, a voter unable to produce ID can still vote if their identity can be verified by another voter, or by casting a declaration vote, which requires further details such as date of birth and a signature. This bill came about despite Tom Rogers, the Australian electoral commissioner, saying that “evidence of multiple voting to date is vanishingly small”. One Nation leader, Pauline Hanson, has claimed credit for the Coalition's voter integrity bill, saying she made voter identification a condition for her support. The Labor party and the Greens were opposed to the Voter ID bill, forcing the Government to approach the remaining crossbench senators – Griff Stirling, Rex Patrick and Jacqui Lambie – to try and pass the bill. After Senator Patrick came out against the Bill, calling it "a solution looking for a problem" and Senator Lambie announced her intention to vote against the bill citing more time was required to consider the bill, the Government announced that they would defer the issue until after the election.

Brazil
In Brazil voting is compulsory to all citizens between 18 and 70 years old. To vote, all citizens must:
 Be registered to vote, getting a voter ID card, called "Título Eleitoral" aka "Título de Eleitor" in Brazil. Presenting the voter ID card when voting is optional
 Report in person to the voting section
 Present an official identity document with photo, usually the regular ID card (cédula de identidade)

Since 2006 the Brazilian Electoral Justice is re-registering voters with biometric identification. In the 2014 elections more than 22 million voters out of 141 million will be identified by fingerprints.

Canada

Federal elections
In Canada, the Federal government mails an Elections Canada registration confirmation card, which the voter takes to the polling station. The card tells the individual where and when to vote. Voters must prove their identity and address with one of three options:
 Show one original government-issued piece of identification with photo, name and address, like a driver's license or a health card.
 Show two original pieces of authorized identification. Both pieces must have a name and one must also have an address. Examples: student ID card, birth certificate, public transportation card, utility bill, bank/credit card statement, etc.
 Take an oath and have an elector who knows the voter vouch for them (both of whom must make a sworn statement). This person must have authorized identification and their name must appear on the list of electors in the same polling division as the voter. This person can only vouch for one person and the person who is vouched for cannot vouch for another elector.

Provincial elections
Voter identification regulations vary from province to province. In Ontario, "ID is required to vote or to add or update your voter information on the voters list" and a substantial number of acceptable IDs, which do not need to be photo IDs, are accepted. In Quebec, the voter must show one of five government-issued photo IDs, and if lacking any of these, will be directed to the identity verification panel. In British Columbia, "all voters must prove their identity and residential address before voting", with three options offered for identification.

France
In France, voters must prove their identity to vote: at the registration (proof of address—A phone, water or electricity invoice...—and an identity document that proves your nationality—National Identity Card or Passport—and on the day of the vote, in towns larger than 1000 inhabitants, an identity document is required.

Finland
In Finnish elections, eligible voters are sent a notice of the right to vote (notification of eligibility) to their home address by mail. The notification of eligibility will designate a voter's polling station, where voters must cast their vote, if voting on election day. Advance voting is possible at any of the general advance polling stations in Finland or abroad. Voters must present an identity document when voting. Voters are encouraged to bring along their notice of the right to vote.

Germany
Germany uses a community-based resident registration system. Everyone eligible to vote receives a personal polling notification by mail, some weeks before the election. The notification indicates the voter's precinct polling station. Voters must present their polling notification and if asked a piece of photo ID (identity card, passport, or other form of identification). As a rule identification is not required other than by the polling notification. If the voter cannot present the notification, a valid ID and an entry in the register of voters can qualify for voting.

Greece 

Voters identify themselves by their ID cards and are given the full number of ballot papers for the constituency plus a blank ballot paper and an empty envelope.

From: Elections in Greece

Hungary
Voting is voluntary for all citizens 18 years or older. All voters should show a photo ID and an address card. To prevent the double voting they need to register themselves if they want to vote at a different place than their address on their address card.

Iceland
Voting is voluntary for all citizens 18 years or older. All voters must present photo ID to vote for their preferred candidate. To prevent double-voting fraud, every voter is checked against the national voter database before their ballot is placed into the ballot box.

India
The Indian voter ID card is an identity document issued by the Election Commission of India to adult domiciles of India who have reached the age of 18, which primarily serves as an identity proof for Indian citizens while casting their ballot in the country's municipal, state, and national elections. It also serves as general identity, address, and age proof for other purposes such as buying a mobile phone SIM card or applying for a passport. It also serves as a Travel Document to travel to Nepal and Bhutan by Land or Air It is also known as Electoral Photo ID Card (EPIC). It was first introduced in 1993 during the tenure of the Chief Election Commissioner TN Seshan. There are 11 other types of alternative identification documents specified that can be accepted for voting

Israel
Similar to Germany, there is a national voters database and photo ID is required (identity card, passport or driving license).

Italy

Italy requires voters to present a photo ID (ID card, driver license, passport) and a voter card ("Tessera elettorale"), which can also be issued on election day.

Luxembourg 
In principle, Luxembourg requires voters to present their passport, identity card, residence permit or visa when voting. However, a derogation allows for this requirement to be waived if a member of staff at the polling station can personally vouch for the identity of the voter.

Mexico

In Mexico voting is a voluntary right and is exercised protected by secrecy. Electoral laws are created by the federal government through the INE: National Electoral Institute (formerly IFE: Instituto Nacional Electoral 1990-2014). A free photo ID or elector's card is issued by right to all citizens of Mexico over 18, but sometimes months prior. Being allowed to commence paperwork before turning 18 is decided upon the day and month of birth, and how it plays in the current year's electoral calendar, as the institute suspends all new registries several months prior to any election. This action allows young Mexicans turning 18 within an inactive period to still enroll and guarantee their right to participate in the coming election. Full legal age in Mexico is 18 for both born and naturalized citizens.

The voting ID card was introduced in 1990 by the now inactive IFE as a tool to "properly identify electors in a country with a history of voters casting multiple ballots and curious vote counts resulting in charges of fraud." After 2014 the IFE was deemed permanently inactive due to minor constitutional reforms; therefore, the INE was simultaneously created. Although both institutes carry out almost exactly the same tasks and duties, this change allowed for yet further homogenization of elections in the country and opening way to what many Mexicans and members of the international community call the first ever legal elections in the country, in 2017. The INE elector's card is currently used in Mexico as the main mean of age and identity validation for legal, commercial and financial purposes, making this a vital document for all Mexicans over the age of 18, and consequently broadening the chance for more citizens participating on election day.

Namibia 
In Namibia, voter ID is needed to cast a ballot. Voter registration cards include a photo and evidence of citizenship.

Netherlands
The registration office of each municipality in the Netherlands maintains a registration of all residents. Every eligible voter receives a personal polling notification by mail some weeks before the election, indicating the polling station of the voter's precinct. Voters must present their polling notification and a piece of photo ID (passport, identity card, or drivers license (a passport or ID is compulsory from the age of 14)). Such photo ID may be expired but not by more than five years.

New Zealand 
You do not need to present any identification when voting, or enrolling to vote, in elections in New Zealand. When voting, voters need to confirm their name and sometimes their address and occupation, and will then be marked off the electoral roll. In more recent elections (such as in 2017 and 2020), Easyvote cards were mailed to enrolled voters to make the process faster.

Norway
Voting in Norway is voluntary for citizens 18 years or older (16 in some municipalities). Every person who is eligible to vote is sent a polling card in the mail about 6 months prior to the election. The polling card recommends the closest voting location to you, usually the closest school, community building or similar. Voters are not required to vote at their assigned location, but they are required to vote within their municipality, unless voting early. Early votes can be submitted at any official polling place in the country. The polling card contains the date(s) of the election, opening times of polling locations and information on how to vote. While it is not mandatory to bring the polling card on the day(s) of the election, it generally makes the process smoother. However, a photographic ID, such as a passport or a driver's license, is required to vote. During the election day after you pick your party, you present your photographic ID and optionally your poll card to the poll attendants who verifies the information against a database, and record that you have voted.

Sweden
When physically voting on election day or during early voting, every voter must provide a valid identification document (such as a passport, drivers license, or an ID card from the Swedish Tax Agency). If a voter is missing valid identification, another person with valid ID-documents can certify the identity of the documentless voter.

Switzerland
There are up to three different ways to vote at the national and cantonal level in Switzerland: 1) directly at the polling station, bringing along some ID (ID card, passport) and the voting material sent by mail three to four weeks before election day; 2) postal voting, by following the instructions included in the voting material sent by mail; 3) voting online, offered in 10 cantons at the beginning of 2019, but not yet at the national level. E-voting is a contentious issue, particularly with regard to a projected digital ID, which raises concerns regarding confidentiality, security and verifiability.

United Kingdom
Photographic identification is mandatory to vote in elections in Northern Ireland.

Before any election all eligible voters are sent a poll card by their local authority, but it is not a requirement to be in possession of a poll card to vote. Voters are asked to give their name and address at the polling station.

A voter ID trial was held for the 2018 United Kingdom local elections by the national Conservative government. Voters in 5 local authorities in England (Bromley, Gosport, Swindon, Watford and Woking) were required to show ID before voting. The legal basis for the trial has been contested.

Voter ID legislation was part of the 2021 Queen's Speech.

In 2022 The national Conservative government passed the Elections Act 2022. The Act introduces voter photo identification for in-person voting to Great Britain for the first time. The requirement would apply to UK general elections, English local elections, and police and crime commissioner elections in England and Wales.

United States

Many states have some form of voter ID requirement, which have been allowed to stand by the Supreme Court.
Fourteen states have a requirement for a photo ID.

Public opinion polls have shown broad support for voter ID laws among voters in the United States. A 2011 Rasmussen poll found that 75% of likely voters "believe voters should be required to show photo identification, such as a driver's license, before being allowed to vote." A 2012 Fox News poll produced similar results, revealing that 87% of Republicans, 74% of independent voters, and 52% of Democrats supported new voter ID laws. More recently, a 2021 Pew Research poll showed that 93% of Republicans and 61% of Democrats favor requirements that voters show government-issued photo ID to vote.

See also 
 Voter registration
 Biometric voter registration

References

Electoral fraud
Election law
Electoral restrictions
ID laws